karghan jadid (also Romanized as karghan jadid; also known as karghan jadid) is a village in Mehranrud-e Jonubi Rural District, in the Central District of Bostanabad County, East Azerbaijan Province, Iran. At the 2006 census, its population was 514, in 106 families.

References 

Populated places in Bostanabad County